Tanvir Mehdi (born November 7, 1972, in Lahore, Punjab), is a former Pakistani cricketer who played one ODI in 1992. He was regarded as one of the fastest bowlers of his time in Pakistan first-class cricket. His career was cut short due to unknown reasons. He bowled the fastest ball of his career at a speed of 154.7 kmph.

References 

1972 births
Living people
Pakistan One Day International cricketers
Pakistani cricketers
United Bank Limited cricketers
Lahore City cricketers
Cricketers from Lahore